Fábio Miguel Rico Lopes (born 10 January 1993) is a Portuguese professional footballer who plays as a midfielder for ARC Oleiros.

Club career
Born in Lisbon, Lopes played youth football with a host of clubs, including Real Betis from Spain where he won the junior national championship. He made his senior debut with C.D. Tondela, his first game in the Segunda Liga taking place on 4 March 2013 when he came on as a late substitute in a 0–2 away loss against C.F. União.

Lopes signed with Primeira Liga team Boavista F.C. in June 2014. He never appeared in any competitive matches for them, being successively loaned to S.C. Farense and S.C. Salgueiros 08.

On 28 February 2017, after nearly two years of inactivity, Lopes joined FC Stumbras from the Lithuanian A Lyga. In his first season, he won the domestic cup.

References

External links

1993 births
Living people
Footballers from Lisbon
Portuguese footballers
Association football midfielders
Liga Portugal 2 players
Campeonato de Portugal (league) players
C.D. Tondela players
F.C. Famalicão players
Boavista F.C. players
S.C. Farense players
S.C. Salgueiros players
C.F. União players
A Lyga players
FC Stumbras players
A.R.C. Oleiros players
Portuguese expatriate footballers
Expatriate footballers in Spain
Expatriate footballers in Lithuania
Portuguese expatriate sportspeople in Spain
Portuguese expatriate sportspeople in Lithuania